Emily Rose Condon (born 1 September 1998) is an Australian football (soccer) player who currently plays for Adelaide United in the Australian W-League.

Club career
Condon made her debut for Adelaide United on 5 January 2014, in the team's 2–0 victory over Canberra United. Upon being substitute onto the pitch in the 59th minute, she became the youngest ever woman to play for Adelaide United.

In the subsequent match, on 11 January 2014, Condon scored her first goal in the 76th minute of a 1–1 draw with Western Sydney Wanderers.

References

1998 births
Living people
Australian women's soccer players
Adelaide United FC (A-League Women) players
Sportswomen from South Australia
Women's association football midfielders
People from Port Pirie